Dubbaka is a Municipal town in Siddipet district of the Indian state of Telangana.

Government and politics 

Municipal administration

Dubbaka Municipality was constituted on 31 January 2013 and is classified as a second grade municipality.

Political 
Solipeta Ramalinga Reddy (died August 2020) of the TRS party was elected four times as the town's MLA. Now Raghunandan Rao of BJP won bypoll Nov 2020

Dubbaka is a newly formed Assembly constituency in Siddipet District. It consists of 7 mandals: Dubbaka, Mirdoddi, Thoguta, Doultabad, Raipol, Chegunta and Narsingi.

References 

Villages in Siddipet district
Mandal headquarters in Siddipet district